St. Joseph's Catholic Hospital is a Christian-run hospital which was established in 1963. It serves everyone around the community in Liberia. The hospital does not charge for providing services to its clients. It is a not for profit institution.

History 

Founded in the 1960s, St. Joseph's was forced to close in 2014 by the Ebola epidemic in Liberia.

See also 
 List of hospitals in Liberia

References

Hospital buildings completed in 1963
1960s establishments in Liberia
Hospitals in Monrovia